Ihor Paliy (Igor Palii, born 10 May 1963) is a contemporary Ukrainian painter, specialized in abstractionism, a combination of Abstract art  and Realism. The technique he mainly uses is Oil on canvas. He is a member of the Community of Artists of Ukraine.

Biography
Igor Palii was born in 1963 in Drohobych, a regional center of Western Ukraine, in a family of musicians and child care workers. In 1986 he finished faculty of architecture at  Lviv Polytechnic National University. After graduation he was involved in various architectural projects combined with canvas painting.

Sakhalin period
In 1986, Igor Palii moved to Sakhalin island.

Polish period
Moved back to Krakow, Poland in 1992. In 1998 Palii’s first personal exhibition in Krakow was organized. Actively participates in polish cultural life and charity campaigns. In 2004 Igor Palii participated in international Art auctions, where his oil-painted canvas “Bez Tytułu. 2001” (“Without A Title.2001”) was sold for 2,772 USD.

Turn to steel art
Since 2002 Igor Palii turned to new art stream beginning to create his own works of art made of steel. The main cause of such turn was the need of three-dimensional figures as an addition to Palii’s paintings in a current project. In order to fulfill his new vision, Igor Palii establishes his own small enterprise of steel art production. The new turn resulted in such projects as decoration of trade center “Sophia”  in the west of Ukraine, restaurant “Flamingo” in Stryi, Ukraine, “Museum of Beer”, “Aivengo” in Lviv, Ukraine. In 1999-2000 creates and implements the project of restaurant-branch “Egypt” (Stryi, Ukraine).

Achievements
 1987: 3rd prize for the best interior of Sakhalin island. The same year initiated an exhibition “Painters of Sakhalin” in Oxa, Sakhalin Republic
 1988: 3rd prize for political illustrations in the city of Yuzhno-Sakhalinsk, Sakhalin Republic
 1993: 1st personal exhibition in the Lviv National Art Gallery
 1994: 2nd personal exhibition in the Lviv National Art Gallery
 1994: Participated in collective exhibition “HungExpo”, Budapest
 1994: Participated in Ukrainian  planner “Maidan 1994”, Lviv, Western Ukraine
 1995: Palii’s exhibits his arts in 2nd collective exhibition, Budapest 
 1996: Starts his collaboration with “Barbara Krakow Gallery”.
1996: Exhibits in galleries “Közület artistichnuj”, “Labyrinth Gallery”, “Galeria Kersten”, Poland
2002: Participated in international exhibition in Köln, Germany at Exhibition Center Köln
2003 - 2004: Personal exhibition in Dijon, France
2009 - 2011: Personal exhibition in Nice, France
2011 – Present: Palii exhibits canvases in Washington D.C., USA

References

Ukrainian artists
Abstract artists
1963 births
Living people